Dioptis egla is a moth of the family Notodontidae first described by Herbert Druce in 1893. It is found in Brazil, Peru and Ecuador.

The larvae feed on Geonoma species.

Description 
Dioptis egla has wing colors similar to the Monarch Butterfly, with orange and black. There are large transparent blotches that make up the majority of the wings.

References

Moths described in 1893
Notodontidae of South America